Also known as Sudi, Mulukbu is a town and railroad station in the Western Region of Kenya.

References
Geoview
Chinci

Populated places in Western Province (Kenya)